Cloonboo is a village in County Galway, Ireland. It is located on the N84 national secondary road from Galway to Castlebar.

References

Towns and villages in County Galway